Angel of Oblivion is a 2011 autobiographical novel written by bilingual Slovenian-German Austrian writer Maja Haderlap. The story revolves around the life of a Carinthian Slovene peasant family that had been badly struck by the National Socialist regime in World War II. The novel highlights Austria's only militarily organised resistance against National Socialism - the Carinthian minority of Carinthian Slovenes as one of the non-Jewish Holocaust's victims.

Awards and honors
In 2016, the German Book Office in New York City chose Angel of Oblivion as its August Pick of the Month.

Notes

References

Novels set during World War II
2011 German novels

External links 

 The Irish Times review
 Kirkus Reviews review
 The National review: "Book review: Maja Haderlap’s Angel of Oblivion tells tale of a Slovenian childhood haunted by war"
 Publishers Weekly review